The Declaration on Euthanasia is the Roman Catholic Church's official document on the topic of euthanasia, a statement that was issued as by the Sacred Congregation for the Doctrine of the Faith in 1980.

Catholic teaching purports that euthanasia is a "crime against life". The teaching of the Catholic Church on euthanasia rests on several core principles of Catholic ethics, including the sanctity of human life, the dignity of the human person, concomitant human rights, due proportionality in casuistic remedies, the unavoidability of death, and the importance of charity. 

In Catholic medical ethics official pronouncements strongly oppose active euthanasia, whether voluntary or not... 

....while allowing dying to proceed without medical interventions that would be considered "extraordinary" or "disproportionate".  The Declaration on Euthanasia states that: 

When inevitable death is imminent... it is permitted in conscience to take the decision to refuse forms of treatment that would only secure a precarious and burdensome prolongation of life, so long as the normal care due to a sick person in similar cases is not interrupted.

The Declaration concludes that doctors, beyond providing medical skill, must above all provide patients "with the comfort of boundless kindness and heartfelt charity".

Although the Declaration allows people to decline heroic medical treatment when death is imminently inevitable, it unequivocally prohibits the hastening of death and restates Vatican II's condemnation of "crimes against life 'such as any type of murder, genocide, abortion, euthanasia, or willful suicide.

References

Religion and euthanasia
Documents of the Congregation for the Doctrine of the Faith
1980 in Christianity
1980 documents